LVRR can refer to one of three railroads in the United States:

Lehigh Valley Railroad (operated 1846 to 1976 in Pennsylvania, New York, and New Jersey)
Ligonier Valley Railroad (operated 1877 to 1952 in Pennsylvania)
Lycoming Valley Railroad (operating from 1996 to present in Pennsylvania)